Manuel Leuterio de Castro Jr. (born July 6, 1949), professionally known as Noli de Castro, is a Filipino journalist, news anchor and politician who served as the 12th vice president of the Philippines from 2004 until 2010, under President Gloria Macapagal Arroyo. He was elected to the Senate of the Philippines in 2001 after receiving the most votes of any senator in the 2001 election.

De Castro is the anchor of radio programs Kabayan and TeleRadyo Balita (formerly Radyo Patrol Balita: Alas Siyete) on DZMM Radyo Patrol 630, ABS-CBN TeleRadyo and Kapamilya Channel and the original and long-running anchor of TV Patrol on ABS-CBN, DZMM Radyo Patrol 630, ABS-CBN TeleRadyo, ANC, Kapamilya Channel and A2Z. He is one of the key television figures in favor of the Philippine drug war undertaken by the administration of President Rodrigo Duterte.

Early life and education 
Noli de Castro was born as Manuel Leuterio de Castro Jr. in the town of Pola, Oriental Mindoro at 4:00 pm on July 6, 1949. He is the fifth child of Manuel de Castro Sr. (born c. 1909) and Demetria (née Leuterio, born c. 1911). He studied at the University of the East in 1971 with a degree in Bachelor of Commerce, majoring in banking and finance, and a doctorate degree Honoris causa from the Polytechnic University of the Philippines.

Broadcasting career 
De Castro began his career as a broadcaster during the presidency of Ferdinand Marcos , when press freedom was suppressed. He worked as a field reporter for Johnny de Leon, a popular radio announcer at the time. He later became a radio announcer in RPN's DWWW station from 1982 to 1986.

After the ouster of Marcos in 1986, de Castro joined ABS-CBN. He got his break into television as the segment host for "At Your Service" of Good Morning! Philippines. He also joined DZMM, a radio station of ABS-CBN, as the anchorman of Kabayan. It was because of the popularity of the program that he gained the nickname "Kabayan Noli".

In 1987, he became one of the pioneer anchors of the news and public affairs hit, TV Patrol. In 1988, de Castro became an anchor on Magandang Gabi... Bayan. In April 1996, he became the sole anchor of TV Patrol, and in January 1999, he became the newscast's overall head of production and became the vice president of DZMM.

During his term as Vice President from 2004 to 2010, he co-anchored Para Sa'yo, Bayan, which aired weekly on DZMM.

In July 12, 2010, Kabayan returned on air with de Castro as its anchor once again. In November 8, 2010, he returned as an anchor of TV Patrol, replacing Julius Babao who left the newscast as the latter would move to Bandila, alongside Korina Sanchez and Ted Failon, with his second stint lasting until October 7, 2021. On January 10, 2011, he started co-anchoring Radyo Patrol Balita: Alas Siyete (later renamed TeleBalita and TeleRadyo Balita in 2020) as it was combined with Kabayan.

He had been a staunch critic of almost all programs of President Benigno Aquino III, who has criticized former President Arroyo, de Castro's running mate in the 2004 elections. He has been known to fire tirades against Aquino throughout Aquino's presidency (which ended in May 2016). During the administration of President Rodrigo Duterte, however, he became meek as former President Arroyo had close ties with Duterte. De Castro has been criticized for perceived misogyny, homophobia and transphobia in live television. In 2018, he was being eyed by the Duterte administration for a possible return in politics under the new administration. De Castro supports the Philippine Drug War. De Castro, along with Persida Acosta, amplified the possibility of Dengvaxia vaccination, which began during former President Aquino's term, as the cause of death of children in the Philippines. It was later proven by the World Health Organization and the Philippine Department of Health that Dengvaxia is safe and that the initial deaths of children were not connected with Dengvaxia. Various organizations have blamed de Castro and Acosta for their misinformation which led to the deaths of numerous Filipino youths due to a "vaccination scare campaign".

On November 8, 2021, after backing out of another Senate run, De Castro returned to ABS-CBN and resumed anchoring both TeleRadyo Balita and Kabayan on TeleRadyo and Kapamilya Channel. He also became the host of the new public affairs program KBYN: Kaagapay ng Bayan on Kapamilya Channel, TeleRadyo and A2Z (until January 1, 2023). On January 9, 2023, he returned to TV Patrol for his third stint, joining Bernadette Sembrano, Henry Omaga-Diaz and Karen Davila, coinciding with the celebration of the Feast of the Black Nazarene.

Political career

Senate career (2001–2004) 
In the 2001 Philippine Senate election, de Castro garnered the most votes and was the top-notcher for that year, garnering over 16.2 million votes running as an Independent under the Puwersa ng Masa coalition, the opposition coalition that backed ousted President Joseph Estrada.

De Castro's three-year stint in the Senate saw him author 252 bills and resolutions, including the Expanded Senior Citizens Act of 2002, Balikbayan Law of 2002, Quarantine Act and Newborn Screening Test Act of 2001.

De Castro did not finish his term, choosing instead to run for the vice presidency in the 2004 Philippine presidential election.

Vice presidency (2004–2010) 

In the 2004 Philippine election, de Castro ran for vice president. He won by a narrow margin over Senator Loren Legarda, but an electoral protest was filed by the latter. The Supreme Court, acting as the Presidential Electoral Tribunal (PET), dismissed the protest. He was appointed by President Arroyo as chairman for housing and urban development (HUDCC). As HUDCC Chair, Vice President de Castro also serves as ex official chairman of the Home Development Mutual Fund (HDMF or Pag-IBIG Fund), the Housing and Land Use Regulatory Board (HLURB), the National Housing Authority (Philippines) (NHA), the National Home Mortgage Finance Corporation (NHMFC) and the Social Housing Finance Corporation (SHFC) as well as ex officio vice chairman of the Home Guaranty Corporation (HGC). He has also been designated as concurrent presidential adviser on overseas Filipino workers, as alternate chairman of the National Anti-Poverty Commission, head of the Task Force Against Illegal Recruitment, price monitoring czar and cabinet officer for Regional Development Palawan.

De Castro was chairman of the Pag-IBIG Fund when the  housing scam involving Globe Asiatique (GA) scam took place. Throughout his vice presidency, de Castro had minimal limelight and was regarded only as "backup" for the then incumbent party coalition if ever President Arroyo was ousted.

2010 presidential election 
De Castro was initially a front runner in the 2010 presidential election. Being the vice president, he was a popular choice among older voters to replace outgoing president Arroyo. However, his lead was taken by Benigno Aquino III (who later won) after Aquino declared his intent to run for president. In December 2009, he did not file to be included on the ballot. In an interview conducted by Karen Davila, he announced that he would retire from politics at the end of his vice presidential term and intended to commit himself full time to broadcast journalism.

2022 Senate election bid and subsequent withdrawal 
De Castro initially announced his intention to run as senator for the 2022 Senate election. On October 7, 2021, he took oath as a new member of Aksyon Demokratiko and made his last appearance on his programs. He subsequently filed his certificate of candidacy on October 8. However, on October 13, he withdrew his candidacy.

References

External links
Official former Senator profile

1949 births
Living people
People from Oriental Mindoro
People from Manila
De La Salle University alumni
Filipino television news anchors
Filipino radio journalists
ABS-CBN personalities
ABS-CBN News and Current Affairs people
Filipino Roman Catholics
Vice presidents of the Philippines
Senators of the 12th Congress of the Philippines
University of the East alumni
Tagalog people
Chairpersons of the Housing and Urban Development Coordinating Council of the Philippines
Independent politicians in the Philippines
Candidates in the 2004 Philippine vice-presidential election
Arroyo administration cabinet members